John Finley may refer to:
John Finley (Finleyville) (1759–1846), pioneer settler of western Pennsylvania
John Park Finley (1854–1943), American tornado expert
John Huston Finley (1863–1940), American academic and editor
John L. Finley (1935–2006), American astronaut
John Finley (musician) (born 1945), Canadian musician
John Michael Finley or J. Michael Finley, American actor, lead role in the 2018 film I Can Only Imagine

See also
John Finlay (disambiguation)
John Findlay (disambiguation)